The 1956 Progressive Conservative leadership election was held to choose a leader for the Progressive Conservative Party of Canada.  The convention was held at the Ottawa Coliseum in Ottawa, Ontario, Canada. The convention began on December 13, 1956 with voting occurring on December 14 when John Diefenbaker was elected the new leader.

Background
The ailing George A. Drew had taken a leave of absence from his duties as Leader of the Opposition for much of 1956 due to a nearly fatal attack of meningitis. After eight years as party leader, he announced his resignation in the fall of 1956 and a leadership convention was announced for December in Ottawa.

Candidates
John Diefenbaker, 61, the Member of Parliament (MP) for Lake Centre and then Prince Albert, Saskatchewan since 1940, announced his third bid for the leadership having run unsuccessfully in 1942 and 1948. 
Donald Fleming, 51, MP for the Toronto riding of Eglinton since 1945, had run in the 1948 leadership election. 
E. Davie Fulton, 40, MP for Kamloops, British Columbia since 1945, was running for leadership for the first time.

Declined
 John Borden Hamilton, 43, MP for the Toronto-area riding of York West since a 1954 by-election, considered running but decided against it.
 George Hees, 46, MP for Broadview since 1950, took soundings about a run, but ultimately dropped out and supported Diefenbaker.
 William Earl Rowe, 62, MP for Dufferin—Simcoe since 1925, and the party's interim leader since Drew's resignation. Though there was some speculation that he might seek to remain as permanent leader until the next federal election, he publicly disclaimed a leadership run before the convention, and quietly supported Fleming's campaign.
 Sidney Earle Smith, 59, President of the University of Toronto since 1945. While several prominent Tories sounded him out about the possibility of running, he decided he had too little experience of electoral politics to run for such a prominent position.

Convention
The convention was opened by Ottawa mayor Charlotte Whitton with Nova Scotia Premier Robert Stanfield, a future party leader, giving the keynote address.

Diefenbaker was nominated by New Brunswick Premier Hugh John Flemming and British Columbia MP George Pearkes. Diefenbaker's failure to have a French speaker as one of his nominees reportedly hurt him with Quebec delegates. They held a meeting and considered supporting one of Diefenbaker's opponents en masse, of which Fleming hoped to be the beneficiary.

The convention supported policies to extend funding for veterans who lacked pensions, a health insurance plan, a new Canadian flag, tax cuts, subsidies for wheat exports, support for NATO and the United Nations, and to remove the responsibilities for broadcast regulation from the Canadian Broadcasting Corporation and instead create an independent regulator. An attempt to remove the word "Progressive" from the party's name was rejected.

Voting
Going into the vote, none of the three declared candidates enjoyed the widespread support of the party's membership; Diefenbaker's western populist stances were seen as too reminiscent of those of unpopular former leader John Bracken, Fleming had been a harsh critic of Drew (who was still personally well-liked among much of the party), hurting his support in his native Ontario, while Fulton was generally considered too inexperienced to be a serious contender. Still, after late attempts to draft interim leader William Earl Rowe and University of Toronto president Sidney Smith both failed, Diefenbaker emerged as the favourite due to being the most experienced of the candidates and having given what was generally seen as the most effective speech at the convention.

As expected, the western provinces heavily favoured Diefenbaker, while Quebec backed Fleming. Ontario was thus left as the key vote, and while Drew could probably have swung the vote of his native province, and thereby victory towards either of the two frontrunners (while the unofficial tradition was for outgoing Tory leaders to remain neutral in the leadership contest to succeed them, Drew still held considerable influence behind the scenes), he ultimately did not do so. The Ontario vote thus came down behind Diefenbaker, earning him a decisive victory on the first ballot.

References

1956
1956 elections in Canada
Progressive Conservative leadership convention